Last mile may refer to:
 Last mile (telecommunications), the final leg of a telecoms network
 Last mile (transportation), the final leg
 "Last Mile", a song by Badmarsh & Shri from the album Signs

See also
 The Last Mile (disambiguation)